Debi Chaudhurani was an Indian Bengali-language period drama that premiered on 16 July 2018 and aired on Star Jalsha daily. It was produced by Subrata Roy, Joydeb Mondal and stars Sonamoni and Rahul Majumdar in lead roles. Sujan Mukherjee, Tanima Sen, Rayati Bhattacharya  among others play supporting roles. Since its launch, Debi Chaudhurani became one of the most-watched shows on its airing channel, Star Jalsha.

The show is an onscreen adaptation of Bankim Chandra Chattapadhyay's renowned novel with the same name. Bankimchandra renewed the call for a resurgent India that fights against oppression of the British Empire with strength from within the common people, based on traditional Indian values of austerity, dedication and selflessness. He championed the tryst of a female protagonist who fought for her people against the oppression of vile Zamindars and British Raj.

Synopsis
Based on the novel by Bankim Chandra Chatterjee by the same name, this period drama follows Prafulla's journey, starting as an innocent young girl, and eventually becoming Debi Chaudhurani, a powerful bandit queen.

The show charts the journey of Prafulla an ordinary girl to become an iconic woman, an aspirational leader and a legendary warrior. Prafulla's journey to becoming ‘Debi Choudhurani’ is nothing short of iconic, she's the savior of the poor, she's revered and respected by all. Like a true queen she fought for her people against the oppression of the British empire and the cruel zamindars. Bankim Chandra championed the struggle of a woman protagonist at a time when women were still behind the purdah, which inspired so many women to gradually join in on the independence movement.  How Prafulla, a woman from an orthodox Bengali backdrop turns into a name feared by the British rulers hold relevance to Bengalis across generations and timelines. A revered leader, a moral compass, a savior to her peasantry, an epitome of austerity and selflessness, very few icons uphold the Bengali feminine spirit as Debi Choudhurani does.

Cast
 Sonamoni Saha as Prafullamukhi Rai aka "Prafulla" / Debi Chaudhurani - Titular protagonist.
 Rahul Majumdar as Brojeswar Rai aka "Brojo" - Prafulla's husband.
 Sujan Mukhopadhyay as Haraballabh Rai - A greedy Zamindar, Brojo's father, Prafulla's father-in-law.
 Awrkojyoti Roy as "Kartiar Sahev" - The British Officer
 Sudip Sarkar as "Sardar" - A dacoit in Bhavani Pathak's troop.
Subhra Sourab Das as East India Company officer
 Sritoma Bhattacharya as Diba - A dacoit in Bhavani Pathak's troop.
 Kanyakumari Mukherjee as Nishi - A dacoit in Bhavani Pathak's troop.
 Sagnik as Bishaai dakat
 Subhamoy Chatterjee as a selfish and greedy Purohit
 Adrija Mukherjee as young Prafulla
 Rayati Bhattacharaya as Prafulla's mother 
 Tanima Sen as Brojeswar's grandmother, Harballabh's paternal aunt.
 Jack as a Selfish Zamindar
 Rupsha Guha
 Dipanjan Bhattacharya
 Anindya Banerjee
 Priyantika Karmakar as Sagar bou
 Seenchita Sanyal as Nayan bou

See also
 Karunamoyee Rani Rashmoni

References

2018 Indian television series debuts
Star Jalsha original programming
Bengali-language television programming in India
2019 Indian television series endings